Herbert William Swears (26 December 1868 in Surrey – 6 March 1946 in Sussex) was an author and playwright active in the United Kingdom between 1890 and 1920. He worked as a bank clerk and his father was blind. He wrote 22 published works including novellette and plays. Herbert Swears's one-act play The young idea was seen in 1936, long after publication across the Atlantic. A tight corner was revived as recently as 2012 by the Comedy Playhouse in Arizona. Swears acted as honorary secretary to the Irving Dramatic Society. Herbert toured the world at least once with a renowned actress Dame Madge Kendal.

Works
1890 Semi Detached
1890 Wayfarers
1890 Home sweet home with variations
1890 Love and Dentistry 
1890 Twilight
1890 Home sweet home with variations
1901 Too Many Cooks
1903 Pansy, that's for thoughts
1904 Mere Man one-act farce – love triangle involving members of an emancipated women's club
1905 Two on a bus 
1910 A tight Corner 
1911 Granny's Juliet (novellette monologue)
1911 Hero and Heroine
1915 Dog Days
1916 The unknown quantity
1920 Captain X: A farcical comedy in three acts
1922 Cupboard Love: A costume comedy in one act
1926 Woman's crowning glory
1927 Things are seldom what they seem
1930 Interlude
1937 When all is said and done Memoir
Widows – adapted to the Scots dialect by Margaret M. Muir (1933)
The Whirlpool
The House of Clay
Such is Fame
Lady Interviewer
Cupid Astray

References

20th-century English dramatists and playwrights
1868 births
1946 deaths
English male dramatists and playwrights
20th-century English male writers